Raymond de Saint-Maur was Governor General for Inde française in the Second French Colonial Empire under Second French Empire under Napoleon III.

Titles Held

French colonial governors and administrators
Governors of French India
People of the Second French Empire
Year of death missing
Year of birth missing